() is an encyclopedia of gastronomy. The majority of the book is about French cuisine, and contains recipes for French dishes and cooking techniques. The first edition included few non-French dishes and ingredients; later editions include many more. The book was originally published by Éditions Larousse in Paris in 1938.

Background
The first edition (1938) was edited by Prosper Montagné, with the collaboration of Dr Alfred Gottschalk, with prefaces by each of author-chefs Georges Auguste Escoffier and Philéas Gilbert (1857-1942). Gilbert was a collaborator in the creation of this book as well as Le Guide Culinaire (1903) with Escoffier, leading to some cross-over with the two books. It caused Escoffier to note when he was asked to write the preface that he could "see with my own eyes," and "Montagné cannot hide from me the fact that he has used Le Guide as a basis for his new book, and certainly used numerous recipes."

The third English edition (2001), which runs to approximately 1,350 pages, has been modernized and includes additional material on other cuisines. It is also available in a concise edition (2003). A new, updated and revised edition was released in October 2009, published by Hamlyn in the UK.

Bibliography
Larousse Gastronomique, Prosper Montagné, maître cuisinier, avec la collaboration du docteur Gottschalk, Paris, Editions Larousse, 1938.
2001 2nd edition, with assistance from a gastronomic committee chaired by Joël Robuchon
James, Kenneth. Escoffier: The King of Chefs. Hambledon and London: Cambridge University Press, 2002.

English translations 
Montagné, Prosper. Larousse gastronomique: the encyclopedia of food, wine & cookery, Ed. Charlotte Turgeon and Nina Froud. New York, Crown Publishers, 1961. The English translation of the 1938 edition. 
Montagné, Prosper. Larousse Gastronomique: The New American Edition of the World's Greatest Culinary Encyclopedia. Edited by Jenifer Harvey Lang. New York: Crown, 1988. Second English edition.
Montagné, Prosper. Larousse Gastronomique: The New American Edition of the World's Greatest Culinary Encyclopedia, Ed. Jenifer Harvey Lang. New York, Crown Publishers, 1998. 
Montagné, Prosper. Larousse Gastronomique: The World's Greatest Culinary Encyclopedia. Edited by Jenifer Harvey Lang. New York: Clarkson Potter, 2001. Third English edition.

References

French cookbooks
French encyclopedias
1938 non-fiction books
Encyclopedias of culture and ethnicity
20th-century encyclopedias
21st-century encyclopedias